Hampton Wick is a Thamesside area of the London Borough of Richmond upon Thames, England, contiguous with Teddington, Kingston upon Thames and Bushy Park.

Market gardening continued until well into the twentieth century. With its road and rail connections to London along the M4 corridor, it is  within the London commuter belt. 

Although north of the River Thames, the area forms part of the Kingston upon Thames and East Molesey post towns based on the south side of the river.

History
There is evidence of Roman occupation. Kingston Bridge, the first bridge linking the village with Kingston upon Thames is dated from about 1219 and replaced the Roman ford at this point.

Cardinal Wolsey is believed to have lived in Hampton Wick (in Lower Teddington Road) while waiting for Hampton Court Palace to be built. The parish of Hampton was split in the century after this time to form Hampton Wick.

Sir Richard Steele also lived in Hampton Wick, in a house he whimsically called "The Hovel". He dedicated the fourth volume of Tatler to Charles, Lord Halifax "from the Hovel at Hampton Wick, April 7, 1711", around the time he became Surveyor of the Royal Stables at Hampton Court Palace, Governor of the King's Comedians, a Justice of the Peace and a knight.

The architect Edward Lapidge both designed and donated the land for a church, St John's Hampton Wick, built in 1831. Lapidge had been born in the village. He also designed the present Kingston Bridge. In 2010, after five years of closure, the church re-opened its doors under the Church of England's church planting scheme. Services were resumed in December 2010.

Hampton Wick in popular culture 

A tone poem Hampton Wick for orchestra was composed by Harry Waldo Warner and won the Hollywood Bowl Competition in 1932, then was premiered by Cincinnati Symphony Orchestra in 1934. The music was based on a poem by Onslow Frampton which was the pen name of Warner himself.

In Cockney rhyming slang, "Hampton Wick" (often shortened to "Hampton") means Tom is a  "dick" or "prick", both of which are British vulgar slang names for the penis. Hence a character called Hugh Jampton in the 1950s BBC radio programme The Goon Show amongst many other similar examples. Another use of the term appeared in the 2000s BBC TV series The Office when Tim Canterbury bemoans the quality of Slough's nightlife, recollecting a Tudor-themed club memorably displaying a punning notice stating "Don't get your Hampton Court" in the men's toilets. The title of rocker Sammy Hagar's 1982 album Standing Hampton also relates to the same piece of rhyming slang.

Hampton Wick was the setting for the 1970s Thames Television situation comedy George and Mildred. The area is near the former Thames studios at Teddington and filming took place at Manor Road in Teddington. Hampton Wick was also the title of The Two Ronnies first "classic serial" spoof drama in their first BBC series (1973). Hampton Wick is referenced by British singer-songwriter Jamie T in the title track of his 2009 EP Sticks 'n' Stones.
The Two Ronnies also use the word to comic effect in their 1971 sketch "The Ministry of Pollution" where the Minister of Pollution (Barker) says, "North and Southampton will be joined together into one enormous hampton".

Hampton Wick (Station) also featured in the sitcom The Fall and Rise of Reginald Perrin as the first of his train-based excuses for arriving late for work: "Eleven minutes late, staff difficulties, Hampton Wick."

Sport and leisureHampton Wick Royal Cricket Club', founded in 1863, is a cricket club at the Royal Cricket Grand Pavilion in Bushy Park. The team currently plays in division three of the Surrey Championship League. The club's first eleven finished the 2006 season as unbeaten champions of the Fullers League Division 2 1st-XI league and gained promotion to Division 1.

The Royal Paddocks Allotments are adjacent to Bushy Park and Hampton Wick Royal Cricket Club. They were established following a lease made by King George V in 1921.

Demography and housing

Economy and transport
The main economic features here are transport. Kingston University has a large hall of residence in the town. Some professional offices are by Kingston Bridge and these include a major office of HSBC bank. The A308 splits the Royal Parks, leading nearby to the A309 and A312 roads, north–south.

Hampton Wick railway station has connections to London Waterloo.

See also
 Hampton Wick War Memorial

References

External links

Notes on Hampton Wick
Hampton Wick Association
Royal Paddock Allotments

 
Areas of London
Districts of the London Borough of Richmond upon Thames
Districts of London on the River Thames
History of the London Borough of Richmond upon Thames
Places formerly in Middlesex
Wards of the London Borough of Richmond upon Thames